The Haiti economic reforms of 1996 were designed to rebuild economy of Haiti after significant downturns suffered in the previous years. The primary reforms were centered on the Emergency Economic Recovery Plan (EERP) and were followed by budget reforms.

Background

Economic situation
Following the 1991 coup d'état which removed democratically elected president Jean-Bertrand Aristide from power, Haiti suffered from internal instability and was placed under an international embargo. The embargo, coupled with the irresponsible economic and financial policies of the newly installed authorities, had devastating effects on the economy of Haiti. It is estimated that in the years 1991–1994, GDP declined by over a third, and inflation at least doubled to 50%,and unemployment reached over 80%. Deforestation and land overuse became increasingly common. As a result of continuing economic problems, Haiti could not escape being poorest country in the Western hemisphere.

The US troops restored president Aristide to power in 1994. Next year, he was peaceful replaced by René Préval, and the US troops were phased out by the United Nations Mission in Haiti. At that time Haiti enjoyed a spotlight in front of the international community, and there was much international interest in helping to rebuild the country.

EERP
Following the lifting of the embargo and the reestablishment of democratic rule, the government of Haiti (Haitian Ministry of Economy and Finance (MEF)) initiated the Emergency Economic Recovery Plan (EERP). EERP was developed, alongside the MEF, by the World Bank, the Inter-American Development Bank (IDB), the United States Agency for International Development (USAID), the United Nations Development Program (UNDP), and the Organization of American States (OAS). The plan was aiming for rapid macroeconomic stabilization and to attract private foreign sector investments. EERP reforms included rebuilding of public administration, privatization (selling off state-owned enterprises), private business promotion, investments in agriculture, municipal, transport, sanitation, health, and education infrastructures, and addressing environmental concerns (with reforestation and soil conservation).

EERP, seen as neoliberal, was criticized for insufficient attention to Haiti's dominant agricultural sector, which employs about 65% of the population; less than 1% of the total funds were allocated for farmers (although more was allocated to supporting areas such as road infrastructure and irrigation system). There was also criticism of unpopular reforms such as privatization, wage freezes and the lowering of tariffs. Reduction in agricultural tariffs, while resulting in lowered food prices, also exposed local farmers to strong international competition; not all farmers could compete.

After implementation of the EERP, Haitian real GDP grew by 4.5 percent in the fiscal year 1994–95; inflation slowed; and the value of the Haitian currency, the gourde, stabilized on the international markets. However, despite signs of economic recovery Haiti faced the problem of a growing budget deficit.  The external current account deficit reached 19 percent of GDP fueled by the resumption of capital inflows and foreign aid.

1996 reforms
In October 1996 the International Monetary Fund (IMF) approved a three-year credit for Haiti of SDR 91.1 million (about US$131 million in 1996 value) to support the Haiti's economic reform program for 1996–99. The planned reforms included increasing taxes, and modernizing fiscal practices. The IMF noted that spending in social areas aimed at addressing the issue of poverty should increase, with the help of foreign aid from "humanitarian organizations and external aid agencies.".

The reforms attempted by the Haitian Ministry of Economy and Finance were severely delayed by political instability in Haiti, such as the resignation of the government in June 1997 (see Haitian general election, 1997) and the suspension of all "new business" by Parliament. Some reforms proved unpopular with politicians, such as privatization and delays in implementations of the reforms led to freezes of the promised international assistance.

There were also various problems with budget reforms implementation. C. Bernard Myers enumerated them as follows:
frequent delays in enacting the annual budget
key components missing from the budget
the budget not reflect the needs and resources of the government
the budget focused on inputs with little accountability for results
the inefficiency of the expenditure process and control

References

Economy of Haiti
History of Haiti
1996 in Haiti
Economic reforms